Verena Keller may refer to:
 Verena Keller (actress)
 Verena Keller (singer)